Kari Liimo (born 6 March 1944) is a Finnish basketball player. He competed in the men's tournament at the 1964 Summer Olympics.

References

External links
 

1944 births
Living people
Finnish men's basketball players
Olympic basketball players of Finland
Basketball players at the 1964 Summer Olympics
People from Lappeenranta
Sportspeople from South Karelia